Albert Edwards was a professional football right half who played in the Football League for Bristol City.

Personal life 
Edwards served during the First World War and was killed in 1918.

References 

English footballers
English Football League players
British Army personnel of World War I
1918 deaths
British military personnel killed in World War I
Association football wing halves
Year of birth missing
Place of birth missing
Place of death missing
Aston Villa F.C. players
Bristol City F.C. players
Newport County A.F.C. players